The Tinée is a river that flows through the Alpes-Maritimes department of southeastern France. Its source is on the east side of the Col de la Bonette, in the Maritime Alps. It flows through Saint-Étienne-de-Tinée, Isola and Saint-Sauveur-sur-Tinée, and it flows into the Var near Utelle. The Guercha and the Vionène are its tributaries.

References

Rivers of France
Rivers of Alpes-Maritimes
Rivers of Provence-Alpes-Côte d'Azur
Braided rivers in France